Hugo Rodallega Martínez (born 25 July 1985) is a Colombian professional footballer who plays as a forward for Bahia.

Rodallega started his professional career with Deportes Quindío in 2004. An impressive first season with the club earned him a call-up to represent Colombia at the U-20 South American Championship in 2005, where he went on to set a new record for most goals scored in the tournament. A move to Deportivo Cali and his senior international debut followed later in the year before he moved abroad, signing for Mexican Primera División side Monterrey. A disappointing spell resulted in a loan move to Atlas before being transferred to Necaxa in 2007.

In January 2009, he moved to Wigan Athletic for a fee of £4.5 million. After initially struggling at the club, he finished as the club's top goalscorer in his first full Premier League season. He scored 24 goals for the club, making him their all-time leading Premier League goalscorer.

Early and personal life
Rodallega was born in El Carmelo, Colombia, and lived in the village with his parents and two elder sisters. Rodallega and his wife Carolina have a son, also named Hugo. His cousin Carmen is also a footballer, and has played for the Colombia women's national football team.

Club career

Early career
Rodallega began his career at local amateur club Boca Juniors de Cali before signing for Deportes Quindío in 2004. He scored his first goal in professional football on 11 April 2004 in a 1–1 draw against Deportivo Cali. He went on to score a total of 13 goals in his first season, earning himself a call-up to the Colombia under-20 squad for the South American Youth Championship. He signed for Deportivo Cali during the middle of the 2005 season, where he won his first honours at club level, helping the team win the 2005-II Copa Mustang.

Rodallega had now caught the attention of foreign clubs and signed for Mexican Primera División club Monterrey in 2006. He failed to replicate his previous goal scoring record, finding the net three times before being loaned out to Atlas. He was then transfer listed after scoring just once in 15 games for Monterrey during the Clausura 2007 tournament, and was subsequently signed by Necaxa. His spell at Necaxa was more successful, where he managed to score 16 goals during his first season with the club.

Wigan Athletic

On 20 December 2008, Necaxa claimed they had started negotiations to sell Rodallega to English Premier League side Wigan Athletic. On 12 January, Wigan manager Steve Bruce confirmed that Rodallega had been granted a work permit, and on 26 January he finally completed his move to the club for a fee of £4.5 million.

Rodallega made his debut for Wigan as a 77th-minute substitute for Amr Zaki against Liverpool on 28 January 2009 at the DW Stadium. He nearly made an instant impact for his new team, hitting the crossbar with a powerful strike from a 25-yard free-kick. After a slow start, he scored his first goal for Wigan against West Brom on 9 May 2009, and went on to score three goals in the last four games of the season, helping the club finish in 11th place.

In Wigan's first match of the 2009–10 season, Rodallega got the team's first goal of the season in a 2–0 away win against Aston Villa, with a "spectacular" half-volley from the corner of the penalty area. Rodallega appeared in all 38 league games during the season, and despite Wigan's new manager Roberto Martínez often playing him on the left wing, he also finished as the club's top goalscorer with ten league goals. On 5 February 2011, Rodallega scored his seventh goal of the season in a 4–3 win against Blackburn Rovers, equalling the club record of 20 Premier League goals for Wigan. He broke that record on 16 April, scoring the opening goal in a 3–1 win against Blackpool at Bloomfield Road, making him Wigan's leading goalscorer of all time in the Premier League.
On 22 May 2011 Rodallega scored a  78th-minute header against Stoke City at the Britannia Stadium which secured a 1–0 win and Wigan's Premier League status for 2011–12.

On 17 December 2011, Rodallega made his 100th league appearance for Wigan, coming onto the pitch as a substitute against Chelsea.
Rodallega later announced that he wanted to leave Wigan and despite no deals were made officially in the January 2012 transfer window. At the end of the 2012 season he was released by the club, his contract having lapsed.

Fulham

On 12 July 2012, Rodallega signed a three-year deal with Fulham after the expiration of his contract at Wigan. He scored his first Fulham goal to open the scoring against former club Wigan in a 2–1 away win on 22 September 2012. He then found the net for a second time against Newcastle United on 10 December 2012 at Craven Cottage, heading in Damien Duff's free kick to win the game 2–1. It was Fulham's first win in seven games.

Rodallega scored the winning goal against fellow strugglers Birmingham City on 27 September 2014, helping Fulham claim their first league victory of the season. On 1 October, Rodallega opened the scoring as Fulham thrashed Bolton 4–0 for their third consecutive win under caretaker manager Kit Symons. On 24 October, Rodallega scored twice as they defeated London rivals Charlton 3–0 to move Fulham out of the relegation zone.

Akhisar Belediyespor
Rodallega signed with Akhisar Belediyespor in 2015. He scored a hat-trick against league leaders Beşiktaş on 23 April 2016. By doing so, he became the first foreign player at Akhisar to score three goals in a match.

International career
In 2005, Rodallega was selected in Colombia's squad for the U-20 South American Championship. He made his debut in Colombia's opening game against Bolivia. He came onto the pitch as a half-time substitute, and went on to score four goals in the second half of the match. Colombia finished the tournament as champions as Rodallega became the tournament's all-time top goal scorer with a total of 11 goals in nine games, beating Luciano Galletti's record of nine goals. Rodallega was also selected for the FIFA U-20 World Cup, but failed to live up to expectations and was dropped from the team after the group stages as Colombia lost against Argentina in the second round.

Rodallega's senior international debut was in a friendly against Venezuela. He briefly played in goal during Colombia's final tournament game at the 2007 Copa América, when first string goalkeeper Róbinson Zapata was given a red card and Colombia had no more available substitutes. He was able to complete the game with Colombia winning 1–0.

On 30 April 2008, Rodallega scored two goals, assisted 1 goal and got a penalty awarded for his country in a 5–2 friendly match victory over Venezuela, being hailed by many Colombians as the return of "Rodagol" who scored 11 goals in the Sub 20 WC qualifier tournament in 2005.

Career statistics

Club

International

Scores and results list Colombia's goal tally first, score column indicates score after each Rodallega goal.

Honours
Deportivo Cali
Primera A: 2005

Colombia Youth
South American Youth Championship: 2005

Footnotes

A.  The "Cup" column constitutes appearances and goals in the InterLiga, the FA Cup and the Turkish Cup.
B.  The "Other" column constitutes appearances and goals in the Copa Sudamericana.

References

External links

1985 births
Living people
Colombian footballers
Association football forwards
Deportes Quindío footballers
Deportivo Cali footballers
C.F. Monterrey players
Atlas F.C. footballers
Club Necaxa footballers
Wigan Athletic F.C. players
Fulham F.C. players
Akhisarspor footballers
Trabzonspor footballers
Denizlispor footballers
Esporte Clube Bahia players
Colombia under-20 international footballers
Colombia international footballers
2007 Copa América players
2011 Copa América players
Categoría Primera A players
Liga MX players
Premier League players
English Football League players
Süper Lig players
Campeonato Brasileiro Série A players
Campeonato Brasileiro Série B players
Colombian expatriate footballers
Expatriate footballers in Mexico
Expatriate footballers in England
Expatriate footballers in Turkey
Expatriate footballers in Brazil
Colombian expatriate sportspeople in Mexico
Colombian expatriate sportspeople in England
Colombian expatriate sportspeople in Turkey
Colombian expatriate sportspeople in Brazil
Sportspeople from Valle del Cauca Department